Ryan Divish is an American sportswriter, blogger, media personality and the Seattle Mariners beat writer for the Seattle Times.

Biography 
Divish grew up in Havre, Montana and played college baseball at Dickinson State University.  Ryan worked  for the Tacoma News Tribune from 2006-2013 where he covered the Seattle Mariners, University of Washington football and Tacoma Rainiers. He was one of the four members of the popular Seattle sports podcast, Karate Emergency, from October 2010 to July 2011, along with Alex Akita and Ashley Ryan. Ryan Divish also frequents as an on-air personality for KJR Sports Radio in Seattle. As of 2014, he currently covers the Mariners for the Seattle Times.

External links

 From Havre to Heaven: The Ryan Divish Story
 Mariners Insider

References

Living people
American sportswriters
Dickinson State University alumni
People from Havre, Montana
Year of birth missing (living people)